Abd al-Aziz (DMG: ʽAbd al-ʽAzīz), frequently also transliterated Abdul-Aziz, is a male Arabic Muslim given name and, in modern usage, surname. It is built from the words ʽAbd, the Arabic definite article and ʽAzīz "Almighty". The name is commonly abbreviated as "ʽAzīz". The name means "servant of the Almighty", al-ʽAzīz being one of the names of God in Islam, which give rise to the Muslim theophoric names.

The letter a of the al- is unstressed, and can be transliterated by almost any vowel, often by u. So the first part can appear as Abdel, without spacing and hyphenation.

It may refer to:

Men

 Abd al-Aziz ibn Marwan (died 705), Umayyad prince and governor of Egypt
 Abd al-Aziz ibn Musa (died 716), governor of Al-Andalus
 Abd al-Aziz ibn Shu'ayb, emir of Crete 949–961
 Abd al-Aziz ibn Mansur (ruled 1104–1121), ruler of the Hammadids (Berber dynasty)
 Abdelaziz al-Malzuzi (died 1298), Moroccan poet and historian
 Nūr ad-Dīn 'Abd al-'Azīz Ibn al-Qamar (1326–1398), Tunisian Berber Muslim prince
 Abd al-Aziz of Mogadishu (active around 1346), Somali ruler in Kinolhas, Maldives
 Abu Faris Abdul Aziz (ruled 1366–1372), Marinid Sultan of Fez and Morocco
 Abu Faris Abd al-Aziz II (ruled 1394–1434, Hafsid Caliph of Ifriqiya (Tunisia)
 Abdelaziz al-Tebaa (died 1499), Moroccan Sufi
 Abdelaziz al-Maghrawi (died 1605), Moroccan poet
 Abd al-Aziz al-Fishtali (1549–1621), Moroccan poet and historian
 Abdul Aziz Hotak (died 1717), ruler of the Ghilzai Hotaki dynasty of Kandahar
 Abdülaziz Efendi (born 1735), Ottoman physician and poet
 Subhizade Abdulaziz (died 1782/1783), Ottoman physician
 Shah Abdul Aziz (1745–1823), Indian Islamic scholar
 Abdul Aziz ibn Muhammad ibn Saud (ruled 1765–1803), ruler of Saudi Arabia
 Abdülaziz (1830–1876), Sultan of the Ottoman Empire
 Abd al Aziz al-Amawi (1832–1896), Somali diplomat, historian, poet, jurist and scholar living in Zanzibar
 Abdulaziz bin Mitab (ruled 1897–1906), ruler of Arabia
 Abdelaziz Thâalbi (1876–1944), Tunisian politician
 Abdul Aziz Al Saud, or Ibn Saud of Saudi Arabia, (1876–1953), King of Saudi Arabia
 Abdelaziz of Morocco (1878–1943), Sultan of Morocco
 Abdul Aziz of Perak (1887–1948), Sultan of Perak, Malaya
 Abdul Aziz Yamulki (1890–1981), Ottoman/Iraqi/Kurdish army officer
 Abdul Aziz Kurd (active 1920), Balochistan politician
 Abdul Aziz bin Musaid (active 1921), Saudi soldier
 Mehmed Abdulaziz (1901–1977), head of the Ottoman dynasty
 Abd al-Aziz ibn Abd Allah ibn Baaz (1910–1999), Grand Mufti of Saudi Arabia
 Abd al-Aziz al-Ghumari (1920–1997), Moroccan Muslim scholar
 Abdol-Aziz Mirza Farmanfarmaian (born 1920), Iranian architect
 Ungku Abdul Aziz (born 1922), British-Malay academic administrator
 Abd El Aziz Muhammad Hejazi (1923–2014), Prime Minister of Egypt
 Abd el-Aziz el-Zoubi (1926–1974), Israeli Arab politician
 Salahuddin Abdul Aziz Shah Al-Haj ibni Hisamuddin Alam Shah Al-Haj, or Salahuddin of Selangor (1926–2001) Yang di-Pertuan Agong of Malaysia
 Abdelaziz Ben Tifour (1927–1970), Algerian footballer
 Abdelaziz Gorgi (1928–2008), Tunisian artist
 Nik Abdul Aziz Nik Mat (1931–2015), Malaysian politician
 Abdelaziz Bouteflika (1937-2021), President of Algeria
 Abdul Aziz Abdul Ghani (1939–2011), Prime Minister of Yemen
 Abdul-Azeez ibn Abdullaah Aal ash-Shaikh (born 1940), Grand Mufti of Saudi Arabia
 Abdul Aziz (cricketer, born 1941) (1941–1959), Pakistani cricketer killed by ball
 Abdul Aziz (cricketer, born 1992), Pakistani cricketer
 Alhaji Abdul Azeez Kolawole Adeyemo (1941–2002), Nigerian politician
 Nasr Abdel Aziz Eleyan (born 1941), Palestinian artist
 Abdel Aziz Khoja (born 1942), Saudi diplomat
 Abdelaziz bin Ahmed Al Thani (1945–2008), Qatari prince
 Abdelaziz Belkhadem (born 1945), Algerian politician
 Hany Abdel-Aziz (born 1946), Egyptian diplomat
 Farouk Abdul-Aziz (born 1946), Egyptian television presenter and writer
 Zaid Abdul-Aziz (born 1946), American basketball player
 Abdulaziz Komilov (born 1947), Uzbek politician
 P. K. Abdul Aziz (born 1947), Indian scientist and academic administrator
 Abdel Aziz al-Rantissi (1947–2004), Palestinian co-founder of Hamas
 Mohamed Abdelaziz (born 1947/1948), Secretary General of the Polisario Front and President of the Sahrawi Arab Democratic Republic
 Abdelaziz bin Khalifa Al Thani (born 1946), Qatari prince
 Ibrahim Abdulaziz Al-Assaf (born 1949), Saudi politician
 Abdul Aziz al-Hakim (1950–2009), Iraqi theologian and politician
 Abdul-Aziz ibn Myatt (born 1950), British Islamist and former neo-nazi
 Abd Al Aziz Awda (born 1950), Palestinian co-founder of Islamic Jihad
 Abdel Aziz El Mubarak (born 1951), Sudanese singer
 Abdulaziz Al-Saqqaf (1952–1999), Yemeni human-rights activist, economist, and journalist
 Abdul-Aziz Abdul-Shafi (born 1952), Egyptian football manager
 Sheikh Abdul Aziz (1952–2008), Kashmiri politician
 Abdul Aziz Al Ghurair (born 1954), UAE businessman
 Maged A. Abdelaziz (born 1954), Egyptian diplomat
 Abdulaziz Al-Anberi (born 1954), Kuwaiti footballer
 Abdulaziz Nasser Al Shamsi (born 1956), UAE diplomat
 Mohamed Ould Abdel Aziz (born 1956), Mauritanian politician
 Abdulazeez Ibrahim (born 1957), Nigerian politician
 Mohammed Abdi Abdulaziz (born 1958), Tanzanian politician
 Amr Abdel Basset Abdel Azeez Diab, or Amr Diab (born 1961), Egyptian singer
 Abdul Aziz bin Abdullah (born 1962), Saudi prince
 Abdulaziz Usman (born 1962), Nigerian politician
 Ali Abd-al-Aziz al-Isawi (born c. 1962), Libyan politician
 Abdul Aziz bin Ahmed Al Saud (born 1963), Saudi prince and businessman
 Saud Abdul Aziz Al Gosaibi (born 1963), Saudi businessman
 Abdul Aziz Al Matrafi (born 1964), Saudi held in Gantanamo
 Ayman Abd El Aziz Nour, or Ayman Nour (born 1964), Egyptian politician
 Abdelaziz Bennij (born 1965), Moroccan footballer
 Abdulaziz Mohamed (born 1965), UAE footballer
 Abdul-Aziz al-Masri, alias of Ali Sayyid Muhamed Mustafa al-Bakri (born 1966), Egyptian alleged terrorist
 Abdullah Muhammed Abdel Aziz (born 1967), Saudi held in Guantanamo
 Abdelaziz Sahere (born 1967), Moroccan runner
 Abdulaziz AlـShayji (born 1967), Kuwaiti politician
 Abdul Aziz Moshood (born 1968), Nigerian footballer
 Abdul Aziz, or Imam Samudra (1970–2008), Indonesian executed for terrorist offences
 Abdel Aziz al-Muqrin (1971–2004), Saudi alleged terrorist
 Mohamed Abdullaziz Al-Deayea, or Mohamed Al-Deayea (born 1972), Saudi footballer
 Abdul Aziz bin Fahd (born 1973), Saudi prince and politician
 Abd Al Aziz Sayer Uwain Al Shammeri (born 1973), Kuwaiti held in Guantanamo
 Abdulaziz Khathran (born 1973), Saudi footballer
 Abdulaziz Al-Janoubi (born 1974), Saudi footballer
 Abdul Aziz Abdullah Ali Al Suadi (born 1974), Yemeni held in Guantanamo
 Abdul Aziz Naji, presumably correct name of Aziz Abdul Naji (born 1975), Algerian held in Guantanamo
 Karim Abdel Aziz (born 1975), Egyptian actor
 Abdulaziz Muhammad Saleh bin Otash (born 1975), Saudi alleged terrorist
 Azmin Azram Abdul Aziz (born 1976), Malaysian footballer
 Mahmoud Abd Al Aziz Abd Al Mujahid (born 1977), Yemeni held in Guantanamo
 Ayman Abdelaziz (born 1978), Egyptian-Turkish footballer
 Abdelaziz Ahanfouf (born 1978), German-Moroccan footballer
 Abdelaziz Touilbini (born 1978), Algerian boxer
 Abdulaziz al-Omari (1979–2001), Saudi aircraft hijacker in the September 11 attacks
 Abdul Aziz Sa'ad Al-Khaldi (born 1979), Saudi held in Guantanamo
 Abdulaziz Karim (born 1979), Qatari footballer
 Abdel Aziz Moussa (born 1980), Chadian-Angolan basketball player
 Abdulaziz Ali (born 1980), Qatari footballer
 Adel Abdulaziz (born 1980), UAE footballer
 Abd Al Aziz Muhammad Ibrahim Al Nasir (born 1980), Saudi held in Guantanamo
 Abdul Aziz Ismail (born 1981), Malaysian footballer
 Abdul Aziz bin Talal bin Abdul Aziz Al Saud (born 1982), Saudi prince
 Abdulaziz Abdelrahman (born 1982), Saudi singer
 Abdul Aziz Abdul Rahman Abdul Aziz Al Baddah (born 1982), Saudi held in Guantanamo
 Abdoul Aziz Hamza (born 1982), Nigerian footballer
 Omar Abdel Aziz (born 1983), Egyptian squash player
 Abdelaziz Kamara (born 1984), French-Mauritanian footballer
 Omar Abdul Aziz (born 1985), Nigerian footballer
 Mohamed Abdelaziz Tchikou (born 1985), Algerian footballer
 Abdulaziz Hatem (born 1985), Qatari footballer
 Abdoul-Aziz Nikiema (born 1985), Burkinabé footballer
 Abdelaziz Tawfik (born 1986), Egyptian footballer
 Abdul Aziz (footballer) (born 1986), Pakistani footballer
 Abdulaziz Al-Kalthem (born 1987), Saudi footballer
 Abdulaziz Al Sulaiti (born 1988), Qatari footballer
 Abdulaziz Belraysh (born 1990), Libyan footballer
 Abdul Aziz Tetteh (born 1990), Ghanaian footballer
 Abdulaziz Fayez Al Alawi (born 1990), UAE footballer
 Abdulaziz Al Salimi (born 1991), Kuwaiti footballer
 Abd Al-Aziz Fawzan Al-Fawzan, Saudi writer and televisor
 Abdul Aziz Said, Syrian-America political writer
 Abdulaziz Sachedina, Tanzanian-American professor of religious studies
 Abdul Aziz Mirza, Pakistani naval officer and diplomat
 Amirsham Abdul Aziz, Malaysian businessman
 Abdul Aziz Ghazi, Pakistani cleric
 Abdul Aziz ibn Ayyaf Al-Miqrin, Saudi politician
 Ibrahim Abdulaziz Sahad, Libyan politician
 Abdul Aziz Abul, Bahraini politician
 Mohamed Nazri Abdul Aziz, Malaysian politician
 Abdul Aziz Abdul Kadir, Malaysian politician
 Abdul Aziz Shamsuddin, Malaysian politician
 Abdelaziz Kareem Salim al-Noofayee, Saudi held in Guantanamo
 Abd-El-Aziz Yousef, Somali footballer

As patronymic
 Umar II, called ibn 'Abd al-'Azīz (ca. 682–720), Umayyad caliph
 Abū 'Ubayd 'Abd Allāh ibn 'Abd al-'Azīz al-Bakri (c. 1014–1094), Andalusi Arab geographer and historian
 Yahya ibn Abd al-Aziz (ruled 1112–1152), ruler of the Hammadids (Berber dynasty)
 Saud bin Abdul-Aziz bin Muhammad bin Saud (ruled 1803–1814), ruler of Saudi Arabia
 Saud Al Kabeer bin Abdulaziz bin Saud bin Faisal Al Saud (born 1878), Saudi prince
 Turki I bin Abdulaziz Al Saud (1900–1919), Saudi prince
 Saud bin Abdul Aziz, or Saud of Saudi Arabia (1902–1969), King of Saudi Arabia
 Faisal ibn Abdul Aziz Al Saud, or Faisal of Saudi Arabia (1904–1975). King of Saudi Arabia
 Muhammad bin Abdulaziz Al Saud (1910–1988), prince in Saudi Arabia
 Khalid bin Abdul Aziz, or Khalid of Saudi Arabia (1912–1982), King of Saudi Arabia
 Saleh Abdul Aziz Al Rajhi (1921–2011), Saudi businessman
 Fahd bin Abdul Aziz Al Saud, or Fahd of Saudi Arabia (1921–2005), King of Saudi Arabia
 Abdullah bin Faisal Al Saud ibn Abd al-Aziz (1922–2007), Saudi prince and businessman
 Bandar bin Abdulaziz Al Saud (1923–2019), Saudi prince
 Abdullah Bin Abdulaziz, or Abdullah of Saudi Arabia (1924-2015), King of Saudi Arabia
 Mishaal bin Abdulaziz Al Saud (1926–2017), Saudi prince and politician
 Sultan bin Abdulaziz Al Saud (born 1928), Saudi prince and politician
 Sulaiman Abdul Aziz Al Rajhi (born 1929), Saudi businessman
 Abdul-Rahman bin Abdulaziz Al Saud (1931–2017), Saudi prince and politician
 Mutaib bin Abdulaziz Al Saud (1931–2019), Saudi prince and politician
 Talal bin Abdulaziz Al Saud (1932–2018), Saudi prince and politician
 Badr bin Abdulaziz Al Saud (born 1933), Saudi prince
 Turki II bin Abdulaziz Al Saud (born 1932/c. 1934–2016), Saudi prince and politician
 Ahmed AbdulAziz AL-Sadoun, or Ahmed Al-Sadoun (born 1934), Kuwaiti politician
 Fawwaz bin Abdulaziz Al Saud (1934–2008), Saudi prince and politician
 Nayef bin Abdulaziz Al Saud (1934–2012), Saudi prince and politician
 Salman bin Abdulaziz al-Saud or Salman of Saudi Arabia (born 1935), current Saudi King and politician
 Samir Abd al-Aziz (born 1937), Iraqi politician
 Sattam bin Abdulaziz Al Saud (born 1941), Saudi prince and politician
 Ahmed bin Abdulaziz Al Saud (born 1942), Saudi prince and politician
 Abdul Majeed bin Abdulaziz Al Saud (1943–2007), Saudi prince
 Saud bin Abdelaziz bin Hamad Al Thani (born 1944), Qatari prince
 Muqrin bin Abdulaziz (born 1945), Saudi prince and politician
 Sami Abdul Aziz Salim Allaithy (born 1956), Egyptian held in Guantanamo
 Nizar ben Abdelaziz Trabelsi, or Nizar Trabelsi (born 1970), Tunisian footballer and alleged terrorist
 Nawwaf bin Abdulaziz Al Saud, Saudi prince and politician
 Saud bin Abdulaziz bin Nasser Al Saud, Saudi prince convicted of murder
 Muhammad Youssef Abdulazeez, perpetrator of the 2015 Chattanooga shootings

Women
 Lobna Abdel Aziz (born 1935), Egyptian actress
 Suad Nasr Abd El Aziz (1953–2007), Egyptian stage, television, and film actress
 Yasmin Abdulaziz (born 1980), Egyptian actress

As patronymic
 Luluwah bint Abdulaziz Al Saud (c. 1928–2009), Saudi princess
 Sultana bint Abdulaziz Al Saud (c. 1928–2009), Saudi princess
 Al Bandari bint Abdulaziz Al Saud (1928–2008), Saudi princess

See also
 Abdul Aziz (disambiguation)

References

Arabic masculine given names
Iranian masculine given names